Phonography is the first official album by American multi-instrumentalist R. Stevie Moore, released in 1976 on the artist's private Vital Records "label". Its initial vinyl pressing was limited to 100 copies. The album mostly consists of selections from his self-released albums Stevie Moore Often (1975) and Stevie Moore Returns (1976), all recorded on 1/4 track 7½ ips reel-to-reel stereo tape decks. A 7-inch EP was issued in 1977 called Four from Phonography, which was the debut release by Moore's uncle Harry Palmer's H.P. Music label.

The album attracted a following among New York's punk and new wave circles. One contemporary review in New York's Trouser Press magazine called the album "an outrageous collection of musical brain spewage" and "a true slash of genius". Phonography ultimately became the best-known album of Moore's career. In 1996, the album was included in the Rolling Stone book Alt-Rock-A-Rama as being among "The Fifty Most Significant Indie Records". In 2011, The Wires Matthew Ingram noted the album for anticipating "lo-fi, DIY, Hypnagogic Pop and more".

Reissues
The album was reissued in a larger general pressing on H.P. Music in late 1978 with a different front cover image. In 1998, it was reissued on CD by Flamingo Records and included 8 non-LP bonus tracks, as well as many photos and an informative interview/essay by Dennis Diken. Another remaster was issued on CD in 2009 by Chris Cutler's Recommended Records without the bonus tracks, but with a new booklet of images and data. In 2010 a newer remaster was reissued on deluxe high-grade vinyl by Sundazed Records.

Track listing
Track sources are provided by Moore.

References

External links
 RSM's PHONOGRAPHY webpage
 Phonography on Bandcamp
 Four From Phonography on MySpace
 Official videos
"I Wish I Could Sing"
"Showing Shadows"
"The Lariat Wressed Posing Hour"

R. Stevie Moore albums
1976 albums
Hypnagogic pop
Art rock albums by American artists